Stacey Campfield (born June 8, 1968) is an American politician. He served as the Republican member of the Tennessee Senate from the 7th district, including Knoxville, Farragut, University of Tennessee, Powell and other parts of Knox County.

Background
Stacey T. Campfield was born on June 8, 1968. Originally from Vestal, New York and a 1986 graduate of Vestal High School where he was named "Sportsman of the year" for Wrestling and later was inducted into their high school hall of fame, Campfield moved to Knoxville at age 25. He received an associate degree in Marketing from Broome Community College in 1989. He received an A.S. in marketing and a  B.S. in Management from Regents College, now Excelsior University.

He has been involved with the Young Republicans, the College Republicans, and the American Red Cross. Campfield is an unmarried Catholic.

Tennessee House of Representatives
He was first elected in 2004 to the Tennessee House of Representatives.

In 2005, Campfield said that he was interested in joining the legislative Black Caucus. Campfield described the group's bylaws as racist because he said they restrict membership based on race, which described as being more restrictive than the Ku Klux Klan's bylaws that only restrict based on the ideology of white supremacy. The leader of the Black Caucus considered asking members of the group to vote on whether to give Campfield honorary membership without voting rights, but Campfield said he only wanted full membership saying "Separate but equal did not work in the 1960s and anything short of full membership is an insult to equal rights."

As of 2006, felons were eligible to vote in Tennessee as long as they are not delinquent on any payments of child support or victim restitution. Because there is no law prohibiting voting by non-felons who are delinquent on child support payment, a bill was proposed dropping the eligibility for felons of being timely with child support payments in 2006. Campfield opposed the bill, saying that one way a felon can show rehabilitation is by being timely on any child support payments.

Campfield sponsored a bill to issue death certificates for aborted fetuses in 2007. Campfield said he wanted people to be able to find out how many abortions were being performed in Tennessee and to note the loss of human lives. Tennessee already required abortions to be reported to the Office of Vital Records, and the number of abortions performed in the state was publicly available.

In 2008, Campfield sponsored a bill requiring public colleges in Tennessee to allow their full-time employees with state-issued handgun-carry permits to carry their handguns on campus. The Tennessee Board of Regent opposed the bill, saying that only campus security police at universities should possess weapons on their campuses, and that local police are the best way to protect community college campuses. Two years later, he sponsored a bill to make private the names of people with state-issued handgun permits, but not the names of people whose permits had been revoked.

Also in 2008, Campfield proposed a bill to ban teachers from teaching as part of the lesson plan about homosexuality in Tennessee's public elementary and middle schools, saying that the topic should only be discussed by each student's family. The bill died in committee. The Tennessee Equality Project opposed the bill, saying that teachers need not advocate for or against homosexuality, but they should allow students to debate the issue of homosexuality.

In 2008, Campfield proposed a bill to prohibit Tennessee public colleges from admitting illegal immigrants. Campfield said that if students cannot enroll in classes with unpaid parking tickets, then students should not be able to enroll in classes if they are in violation of federal immigration laws either.

In 2009, Campfield introduced a bill to limit lottery winnings to $600 for people on public assistance. Campfield said that people on public assistance should not be buying lottery tickets and instead should be using that money to buy food for their children. Tennessee law already prohibited the use of public assistance money to purchase lottery tickets. The bill also prohibited prisoners from redeeming winning lottery tickets.

Tennessee Senate
In 2010 Campfield was elected to the State Senate. The seat was previously held by Tim Burchett. His opponent, Democrat Randy Walker, had openly solicited support from moderate Republicans in the November election but was defeated 37–53%.

Tennessee holds open primaries, where any voter may vote in any party's primary election. Campfield introduced a bill to change to a closed primary. The bill would only allow a registered voter to vote in a primary election if the voter was affiliated with that particular political party. Campfield said that voters often vote in the other party's primary in order to vote for a weaker candidate or one that is closer to the voter's own party's politician positions, both of which Campfield opposed.

On August 7, 2014, Campfield was defeated 66%-28% in the Republican state senate primary by Knox County Commissioner Richard Briggs who outspent Campfield almost 4 to 1 (Briggs $380,000.00 to Campfields $100,000.00). 
Briggs had courted many high-profile Democrats who had openly encouraged Democrats to cross party lines to unseat Campfield in the Republican primary.

State tribal recognition for Native Americans 
In three successive years, 2011—SB 1802, 2012—SB 2177, 2013—SB 489, Campfield sponsored bills to grant state tribal recognition to six groups of not publicly documented Native American descendants, which would have also appointed the six groups, known collectively as the "Confederation of Tennessee Native Tribes", as the means for other Native Americans not relocated during the "trail of tears" to receive state recognition as Native American Indian tribes. The bills were either withdrawn or died in committee. Campfield's sponsorship was seen as largely 'carrying water' for Lieutenant Governor Ron Ramsey in whose district one of the groups also resides and whose previous state representative Nathan Vaughn initiated the legislation in 2008.

"Classroom protection" bill
In 2011 as a senator, he revived his 2008 "pro traditional family education" bill as SB49, the so-called "Don't Say Gay" bill, and it gained national and international attention. Openly gay filmmaker Del Shores challenged him to a debate about it. Lillian Faderman and Harvard historian Ian Lekus agreed it encouraged dishonesty and could lead to further suicide among LGBT youth. In an interview, Campfield explained he supported anti-bullying legislation for all children, not just for the LGBT community. Later however, he remarked, "that bullying thing is the biggest lark out there. Tennessee already has anti bullying laws that cover everyone and many groups are using "bullying" to push their social agenda in schools"

Modification of "Classroom protection" bill
In January 2013, Campfield introduced a modified version of his "Classroom protection act" bill. This version allows teachers and guidance counselors to answer a child's private questions about sexuality, but forces the counselors to tell the child's parents if those responses included activity that could be life-threatening or possible sexual abuse. Many gay rights advocates believed this information could result in the disclosure of a child's sexual orientation to their parents.

Decreased welfare to parents who are not involved with their failing child's education
In 2013, Campfield introduced Senate Bill 0132, which cuts by 30% the payment made to parents or caretakers of children in families eligible for Tennessee's Temporary Assistance to Needy Families program if any of the children fail to meet requirements for grades or attendance and the parent refused to go to any parent teacher conferences, parent counseling or to enroll their child in free tutoring programs.

In April 2013, Campfield postponed this Bill after an organized protest by community activists at the State Capitol. Eight-year-old Aamira Fetuga followed him around Capitol Hill with a signed petition opposing the bill while asking him questions and sharing her concerns. Campfield said "Children should not be used as props to push their parents agenda." The bill was postponed shortly thereafter but was passed the next year with stronger requirements and tougher restrictions.

Other news events
Campfield has appeared or been quoted on multiple national, international news broadcasts and media outlets for his legislation as well as his outspoken, and often creative  conservative views. Among the broadcasts: TMZ, CNN with Wolf Blitzer, Pierce Morgan and Martin Bashir, The O'Reilly Factor with Bill O'Reilly, Morning Joe with Joe Scarborough, NBC's "Tonight Show" with Jay Leno. "The View", Comedy Central's "The Daily Show", "The Colbert Report" allegedly, "South Park" which had an episode regarding his exclusion from the Black Caucus, Rush Limbaugh, Allan Colmes, Michael Reagan, USA Today, NewsWeek, The Washington Times, as well as others.

Campfield currently hosts a TV show "The Reality Camp" on IAM TV and the Brighteon Network.

Musicals and Plays
To date there have been two musicals and one play written about Campfield and his life in the legislature.  The most recent one sold out for multiple nights and received strong reviews from multiple Tennessee newspapers. While not portraying him in a positive light, Campfield himself quipped he was glad he could support the arts and was even willing to do a cameo role.

Duncan Barbecue
In 2002, at one of Republican Congressman Jimmy Duncan's annual barbecues, Campfield followed candidate for Governor of Tennessee Phil Bredesen with a sign saying "Tax 'n' Spend Governor". He was forcibly removed by security after being attacked by a Bredesen supporter but was later allowed to come back into the event.

2009 UT Neyland Stadium football game
On October 31, 2009, Campfield attended the Halloween Volunteers football game with the University of South Carolina at the University of Tennessee Neyland Stadium where he was briefly questioned, searched, and detained allegedly after the mother of two young girls complained that the presence of a masked Campfield had allegedly frightened two young girls. The girls had previously been told by UT stadium security that masks were not allowed to be worn inside the stadium for the Halloween football game). While Campfield was questioned in section B he was reported as only having stadium seating admission tickets for Section LL  and was then escorted outside of the stadium by two UT deputies. Campfield later offered college scholarships to the two girls if they were ever identified. They never were. Several people accused UT legal council Ron Leadbetter of having a report made weeks later just to use in his campaign to unseat Campfield for the state house that same year.

Campfield on the origin and transmission of AIDS
In a January 2012 interview with Michelangelo Signorile, Campfield replied to a question on the history of AIDS  "most people realize that AIDS came from the homosexual community – it was one guy screwing a monkey, if I recall correctly, and then having sex with men. It was an airline pilot, if I recall.... My understanding is that it is virtually – not completely, but virtually – impossible to contract AIDS through heterosexual sex...very rarely [transmitted]." He later quoted the odds of heterosexual vaginal transmission at 1 in 5 million.

Medical authority sources disagree: "When risk is assessed per act of unprotected vaginal intercourse" (between an infected male and a female partner), "the chance of HIV transmission is estimated to be between 1 in 500 and 1 in 1000." Campfield said the numbers quoted by him were for transmission to heterosexual US males through vaginal intercourse, with protection, multiplied by the odds of actually having sex with an AIDS infected, heterosexual female partner in the US. Those odds were roughly 1 in 5 million.

Although there is no definitive origin or "Patient 0" many assume, contrary to Campfield's statement, HIV's various distinct strains may possibly have come about in humans on numerous separate occasions because of the handling and consumption of bushmeat infected with Simian immunodeficiency virus, according to the Centers for Disease Control and Prevention and the World Health Organization. while not being able to completely refute his claim Health experts expressed concern about the possible health consequences of Campfield's remarks. Campfield's "airline pilot" reference likely referred to the case of Gaëtan Dugas, a flight attendant who was falsely referred to as "Patient Zero", by the late Randy Shilts in his 1987 book on the modern US outbreak of AIDS, And The Band Played On.

When later asked about his comments, Campfield said that some of his comments were taken out of context, saying that "I'm not a historian on AIDS ... but I've read and seen what other people have read and seen and those facts and numbers, in context, are out there and even backed up by the CDC numbers."

Bistro at the Bijou in Knoxville
On January 29, 2012, the owner of the cafe Bistro at the Bijou, Martha Boggs in Knoxville asked Stacey Campfield to leave the restaurant as a stand for gay rights. He was asked to leave because of his assertion that HIV is seldom transmitted through heterosexual sex and because Boggs believed his comments to be homophobic.

Intellectual property
Since March 2005, Campfield has maintained a public blog that includes a warning that any quotation from it for print will be charged at "$1,000 USD per word".

Gun politics
In 2013 Campfield appeared on CNN with  Piers Morgan and debated gun rights and a possible gun ban in the USA. Campfield called gun control a failure and at one point asked when Morgan planned to fulfill his promise to leave the USA if gun control failed. Morgan said he would "Wait and see". Campfield would later move to stop local municipalities from implementing second amendment restrictions beyond what the state had implemented saying the state constitution only allows the legislature to regulate the wearing of arms and that "constitutional freedoms should be protected at all levels, not struck down at the lowest level. We should no more accept local restrictions on the second amendment than we do the first".

Drug testing for government benefits
In 2012 Campfield authored legislation requiring suspicion based drug testing for those receiving cash government benefits.  Those failing the test were referred to drug treatment centers but were allowed to stay on government benefits if they continued drug treatment and remained drug-free for 6 months. If they failed another drug test at the end of 6 months they would be banned from the program for 1 year. Early testing results showed an 18% failure rate of those tested for drugs. All of the money saved by the drug testing program remained in the assistance program to help others that qualified.

Obamacare Holocaust comparison
On May 5, 2014, Campfield drew widespread criticism for a blog post comparing mandatory signups under the Affordable Care Act (Obamacare) to the "train rides" the Jews took under Nazi Germany ("Democrats bragging about the number of mandatory sign ups for Obamacare is like Germans bragging about the number of mandatory sign ups for 'train rides' for Jews in the 40s."). Campfield responded to the criticism saying it missed his point about "government mandates and bureaucrats deciding who should be given life saving medications and who should be denied" and government funding for abortion.

References

External links 
Stacey Campfield at Ballotpedia

Campfield's blog
Campaign Contributions: 2008, 2006, 2004, 2002

1968 births
Living people
Real estate and property developers
Republican Party members of the Tennessee House of Representatives
Republican Party Tennessee state senators
Excelsior College alumni
University of Tennessee faculty
Politicians from Knoxville, Tennessee
People from Vestal, New York
Catholics from New York (state)
Catholics from Tennessee